Louisa Lizbeth Chase (March 18, 1951 – May 8, 2016) was an American neo-expressionist painter and printmaker.

Life
Chase was born in 1951 in Panama City, Panama. She grew up in Lancaster, Pennsylvania. She earned her BFA in printmaking from Syracuse University in 1973 and her MFA in fine art from Yale University School of Art in New Haven, Connecticut in 1975. In the year of her graduation she had her first New York exhibition, at the alternative gallery Artists Space.

She taught painting at the Rhode Island School of Design from 1975–1979, and at the School of Visual Arts from 1980-1982. She was a National Endowment for the Arts grantee.

She exhibited at the 1984 Venice Biennale.  Her solo exhibitions include: Brooke Alexander Gallery (1989) The Texas Gallery in Houston (1987); Gallery Inge Baker in Cologne, Germany (1983) and others. She had solo exhibitions at Boston’s Institute of Contemporary Art, Wisconsin’s Madison Art Center, and Baltimore’s Contemporary Museum. Her work was featured in group exhibitions at the New Museum, the Whitney Museum, the Rhode Island School of Design’s Museum of Art, SFMoMA, LACMA and the Brooklyn Museum.

Her work is in the collections of: the Museum of Modern Art, the Metropolitan Museum of Art, the Whitney Museum of American Art, the Corcoran Gallery, the Library of Congress, the Minneapolis Institute of Arts, the Walker Art Center, the Mount Holyoke College Art Museum, the Syracuse University Art Museum, the Denver Art Museum, the Elvehjem Museum of Art, and the Madison Museum of Contemporary Art.

Chase lived in Sag Harbor, New York. She died on May 8, 2016 in East Hampton, New York, at the age of 65.

Art 

Louisa Chase is known for her use of schematically drawn body parts (i.e. hands, feet, torsos) and elements of landscape, separately or combined.  She used a bright color palette and geometric forms.  Chase paid special attention to the brushstrokes and markings in wood in her pieces.  Chase’s work shows influence from New Image Painting and Neo-Expressionism.

Chase’s paintings often have a sense of juxtaposition between disturbing imagery and lightness or even humor of style.  “When peopled, her fragments of place are inhabited by partial figures: torsos, hands, feet.  They are hovering or falling or drowning or being assumed into the sky.” This imagery is contrasted by the cartoonish style with which Chase would symbolize these body parts, the many energetic brushstrokes and the bold colors she would use.  Swimmer, in the collection of the Honolulu Museum of Art, is an example of Chase's use of cartoonish human bodies and body parts rendered in geometric shapes.

Exhibitions
 1975 Artists Space, New York
 1979 Chase's work "Tears, Ocean II" part of Painting: The Eighties at NYU
 1985 New Currents: Louisa Chase. Institute of Contemporary Art, Boston
 1996 Madison Art Center
 2008 Goya Contemporary & Goya–Girl Press in Baltimore, Maryland

Works and publications

References

External links
 Louisa Chase (American, b. 1951)
 "Christine Neill & Louisa Chase at Goya Contemporary", Cara Ober, June 1, 2008
 Louisa Chase | Artnet
 Louisa Chase, American (1951 - 2016)

1951 births
2016 deaths
20th-century American painters
21st-century American painters
People from Panama City
Syracuse University College of Visual and Performing Arts alumni
Yale School of Art alumni
Rhode Island School of Design faculty
School of Visual Arts faculty
Artists from Lancaster, Pennsylvania
People from Sag Harbor, New York
20th-century American printmakers
American women painters
20th-century American women artists
21st-century American women artists
American women printmakers
American women academics
Neo-expressionist artists